Xanəgah (also, Xanagah, Khanaga, Khanagyakh, and Khanegya) is a village and municipality in the Ismailli Rayon of Azerbaijan. Its population is 505.

References 

Populated places in Ismayilli District